Paris Berelc (born December 29, 1998) is an American actress and model. She is known for her roles as Skylar Storm in the Disney XD series Mighty Med and Lab Rats: Elite Force, and Alexa Mendoza in the Netflix sitcom Alexa & Katie.

Life and career 
Berelc was born in Milwaukee, Wisconsin, and is of half Filipino descent. She was discovered by Ford Models at the age of nine, and was featured in ads from Kohl's, Boston Store, Sears, and K-mart. She appeared on the cover of American Girl magazine for their November/December Issue in 2009. In 2010, at the age of 12, Berelc took her first acting classes at the Acting Studio Chicago. Two years after, Berelc's parents decided to take her to Los Angeles to try acting professionally. She began her professional acting career in 2013, at the age of 14.

Beginning in 2013, Berelc starred as Skylar Storm on the Disney XD action sitcom Mighty Med. In 2015, Berelc portrayed Molly in the Disney Channel Original Movie, Invisible Sister, which premiered in October. The same year, Mighty Med ended its run, but Berelc continued to play Skylar Storm on its spinoff series Lab Rats: Elite Force, which premiered on March 2, 2016. 

In April 2017, Berelc was cast in the co-lead role of Alexa in Alexa & Katie, a multi-camera Netflix sitcom, which premiered March 23, 2018. In 2019, she starred in the Netflix original film Tall Girl as Liz. In 2020, she appeared as Megan in the Netflix original film Hubie Halloween.

Filmography

References

External links 
 

1998 births
Living people
21st-century American actresses
American child actresses
American film actresses
American television actresses
American child models
American female models
American models of Filipino descent